Tattva can refer to:
Philosophy
Tattva, a Sanskrit word meaning 'thatness', 'principle', 'reality' or 'truth'.
Tattva (Jainism), the reals or the seven (sometimes nine) fundamental principles of Jainism.
Music
Tattva, a 1996 hit song by Kula Shaker.